Big Dry Creek is a  tributary that joins the South Platte River in Englewood, Colorado.  The creek's source is in Daniels Park in Douglas County.

See also
List of rivers of Colorado
Big Dry Creek (Westminster, Colorado)

References

Rivers of Arapahoe County, Colorado
Rivers of Douglas County, Colorado
Rivers of Colorado
Tributaries of the Platte River